Domenico Menozzi (17771841) was an Italian painter of the Neoclassical period.

Biography
He was born in Reggio Emilia, but soon moved to Bergamo and then Milan in 1801, where he was active for more than three decades as a landscape and decorative painter, but best remembered as a scenic designer. In Reggio, he is said to have painted for the house of Vincenzo Linari and the Lawyer Bongiovanni.

References

18th-century Italian painters
19th-century Italian painters
Italian male painters
Italian scenic designers
People from Reggio Emilia
1777 births
1841 deaths
19th-century Italian male artists
18th-century Italian male artists